Winterbourne Down can mean:

 Winterbourne Down, South Gloucestershire
 Winterbourne Down, Wiltshire, a hill overlooking Firsdown